TST may stand for:

Science and technology
Ternary search tree, in computer science
Transition state theory, of chemical reaction rates
TST (gene)
Tuberculin skin test
Tectonic strain theory
Total sleep time
Total station theodolite
Typed set theory, in mathematical logic
Transgressive systems tract, in sequence stratigraphy
Tail suspension test

Places
Tsim Sha Tsui, an urbanized area in Hong Kong
Tsim Sha Tsui station, a railway station there
Trang Airport in Thailand (IATA airport code)

Organisations and groups
Telesta Therapeutics, Toronto Stock Exchange symbol
TheStreet.com, NASDAQ trading symbol
Toronto School of Theology, Canada
TST-CF Express, Canadian LTL freight carrier formerly known as TST Overland Express
Tribunal Superior do Trabalho, (Superior Labor Court), Brazil federal courts
The Satanic Temple, nontheistic religious and human rights organization

Other
.TST, ExamView file extension
Tolley, Scott & Tolley, Australian winemakers
Top Secret (TST), a South Korean band
The Soccer Tournament, a sports tournament